The 2018 Florida State Seminoles softball team represented Florida State University in the 2018 NCAA Division I softball season.  The Seminoles were coached by Lonni Alameda, in her tenth season. They played their home games at JoAmne Graf Field and competed in the Atlantic Coast Conference.

The Seminoles were invited to the 2018 NCAA Division I softball tournament, where they won the Tallahassee Regional, and the Tallahassee Super Regional, and then completed a run through the Women's College World Series to claim their first NCAA Women's College World Series Championship.

Roster

Schedule

References

Florida State
Florida State Seminoles softball seasons
Florida State Softball
Florida State
Women's College World Series seasons
NCAA Division I softball tournament seasons
Atlantic Coast Conference softball champion seasons